The Union of Patriots for Renewal (UPPR) is a political party in Mali led by Moussa Bamadio.

History
The party was officially registered on 6 June 2013. In the 2013 parliamentary elections it won a single seat in the National Assembly.

References

Political parties in Mali
Political parties established in 2013